Anser was a poet of ancient Rome who lived in the 1st century BCE. He was a friend of the triumvir Mark Antony, and one of the detractors of Virgil. He wrote in an indelicate or unserious style. Ovid calls him procax, an adjective meaning "shameless" or "impudent".

Some scholars have suggested that Anser is the same man who is elsewhere referred to as Lycidas, and that "Anser" is a pseudonym for this poet writing unserious work. ("Anser" is Latin for "goose".) Other scholars—even if they do not identify "Anser" with Lycidas—question whether there was ever a person who was actually named "Anser", or whether it was just a generic dismissal of a bad poet. The 4th-century grammarian Servius asserts that "Anser" was indeed a specific person with that name, but he is the only source who makes this claim unambiguously, and was writing several centuries after Anser was said to have lived.

Notes

1st-century BC Romans
1st-century BC Roman poets
Ancient Roman poets